Old Stillington is a village in County Durham, in England. It is situated a few miles to the north-west of Stockton-on-Tees, and a short distance from Stillington.

Villages in County Durham